Joseph Kevin Loney (born 30 August 1951) is an Irish former cricketer.

Loney was born in Northern Ireland at Lurgan in August 1951. He later studied in England at Emmanuel College at the University of Cambridge. While studying at Cambridge, he made two appearances in first-class cricket for Cambridge University against Kent and Warwickshire at Fenner's in 1974, scoring 4 runs. He also made a single appearance for Cambridge in List A one-day cricket in the 1974 Benson & Hedges Cup against Sussex at Hove, opening the batting and scoring 35 runs before being dismissed by John Barclay, which was the highest score in the Cambridge innings of 94 all out in response to Sussex's 280 for 5.

Notes and references

External links

1951 births
Living people
People from Lurgan
Alumni of Emmanuel College, Cambridge
Cricketers from Northern Ireland
Irish cricketers
Cambridge University cricketers